Chinese Basketball Association (CBA) Most Valuable Player (MVP) is the annual award that is handed out at the end of each Chinese Basketball Association (CBA) regular season to the league's most valuable player. From the league's inaugural 1995–96 season until the 2011–12 season, only Chinese/Taiwanese players were eligible to win the award. Since the 2012–13 season, separate awards for both domestic and international players have been handed out. Domestic players are eligible to win the CBA Domestic Most Valuable Player award, while international players are eligible to win the CBA International Most Valuable Player award.

Award winners

Just one Most Valuable Player award was given out at the conclusion of each of the first 17 Chinese Basketball Association seasons. To reflect the league's growing internationalization, however, the honor was split into domestic and International awards as of the 2012–13 season.

Notes
 Mengke Bateer of the Beijing Ducks was originally chosen as the 2005–06 CBA Regular Season MVP, but he was later stripped of the honor as a disciplinary punishment for arguing with a referee, which led to a suspension.

See also
CBA Finals MVP
CBA Scoring Champion

References

External links
 CBA league official website 
 CBA federation official website 
 CBA at Asia-Basket.com 

Chinese Basketball Association awards